The Republic of Korea Armed Forces's Defense Security Command (DSC) was founded as the Army Counter Intelligence Corps (commonly known as CIC or KACIC; meaning: Special Operation Forces) on October 21, 1950, and it functioned as the primary organization within the military charged with internal security, preservation of loyalty to the regime, and deterrence and investigation of subversion.

The DSC is often known by its short name Boansa (Boan Saryeongbu) until January 1, 1991, and Gimusa (Gimu Saryeongbu) since January 1, 1991.
In September 2018, it was reorganized as Defense Security Support Command.

History
The Defense Security Command was formally activated in October 1977. This merger of the Army Security Command, the Navy Security Unit, and the Air Force Office of Special Investigations produced a single, integrated unit under the direct command and operational control of the minister of national defense.

Chun Doo-hwan became chief of the Defense Security Command in February 1979, eight months before Park Chung-hee was assassinated on October 26, 1979. From his position as commander of the DSC, Chun effectively became chief investigator of the assassination, said Don Oberdorfer in his book The Two Koreas. On December 12, 1979, a group of generals led by Chun arrested martial law commander General Jeong Seung-hwa, the army chief of staff, and seized key sites in the capital.

In August 2018, it was dismantled due to its relation with former South Korean president Park Geun-hye. The martial law events were reviewed in case President Park's impeachment would be dismissed.

The DSC's involvement in 1979 was considered and defined as attempt of a coup by state council.

Successor
In September 2018, it was reorganized as Defense Security Support Command.

Criticism
On November 11, 2011, the Seoul National Labor Relations Commission exposed a Defense Security Command member who had been illegally collecting the information of civilians registered in the National Health Insurance Corporation for three and a half years.

References

External links
Official website(Korean)
Official website(English)
Globalsecurity.org, Defense Security Command, accessed October 2009

South Korean military intelligence agencies
Military units and formations established in 1977
Military units and formations disestablished in 2018
Ministry of National Defense (South Korea)
Counterintelligence agencies